

Sports 
The Laws of the Game  may refer to the codified rules of a number of different sports:

Laws of the Game (association football)
Laws of Australian rules football
Bandy Playing Rules
Rules of chess
Laws of cricket
Laws of rugby league
Laws of rugby union

Other uses 
The Laws of the Game, title of a book by Manfred Eigen and Ruthild Winkler

See also
 Laws of football (disambiguation)
 Sports law for legal aspects of sports